Flying Officer George Ebben Randall  (born 19 January 1899, date of death unknown) was a British World War I flying ace credited with eleven aerial victories.

Early life
George Ebben Randall was born in London, England on 19 January 1899.

Military service

Randall joined the Royal Flying Corps as a cadet, and was commissioned as a temporary second lieutenant (on probation) on 4 April 1917, being appointed a flying officer (observer) and confirmed in his rank on 15 July, with seniority from 17 May. He served for some time in No. 3 Squadron RFC as an observer/gunner, before training as a pilot, being promoted to lieutenant, finally being appointed a flying officer on 20 May 1918.

He was then posted to No. 20 Squadron RAF, flying the Bristol F.2 Fighter, and shot down eleven German fighter aircraft between 24 July and 10 November 1918. His last two victories, on the day before the Armistice, won him a Distinguished Flying Cross. His observer/gunners included Sergeant Arthur Ernest Newland. Randall's final tally was seven enemy planes destroyed, four driven down out of control.

Randall's DFC was gazetted on 7 February 1919. His citation read:
Lieutenant George Ebben Randall.
"A brave and resourceful flight commander who has, within the last four months previous to November 11th, led 71 offensive patrols. On 10th November, engaging a superior number of enemy aircraft, he himself shot down two, and the remainder were driven off by his flight. In addition to the foregoing he has four other enemy machines to his credit."

Postwar career
On 1 August 1919, Randall was a granted permanent commission in the RAF with the rank of flying officer. On 9 July 1920, he was awarded a Bar to his DFC, for his part in operations in Waziristan.

Randall then appears to have run into financial difficulties, as on 6 July 1922, while serving at RAF Uxbridge, he was declared bankrupt. He resigned his commission on 22 November 1922.

References

Bibliography
 
 

1899 births
Year of death missing
Royal Flying Corps officers
Royal Air Force personnel of World War I
British World War I flying aces
British military personnel of the Waziristan Campaign
Recipients of the Distinguished Flying Cross (United Kingdom)
Royal Air Force officers
Military personnel from London